Dan Azeez (born 30 August 1989) is a British professional boxer. He is the only British light-heavyweight to capture all British Boxing Board of Control domestic titles. He has held the British title since 2021; the Commonwealth title since 2022; and European title since March 2023.

Amateur career 
Azeez started boxing as an amateur competitively whilst studying at Essex University where he got a degree in Accounting and Finance. He boxed under the tutelage of Gordon Charlesworth at the Colchester-based amateur boxing club. Dan had over 60 contests and was crowned ABA South of England champion three times. Azeez won the prestigious Box Cup tournament in 2013 at London's Alexandra Palace.

Professional career 
In December 2017, Azeez made his professional debut against Daniel Borisov at the Brentwood Centre in Essex, scoring two knock downs on the way to a dominant points decision.

On 20 July 2019 after eight fights, Dan Azeez challenged for the vacant Southern Area title on the Dillian Whyte vs Oscar Rivas undercard live on Sky Sports at The O2 Arena against fellow Londoner Charlie Duffield . Azeez dominated from the first round causing swelling under Duffield's left eye which only got worse as the rounds continued . After a number of right hands delivered from Azeez in the sixth round, the referee stopped the bout whilst Duffield's corner threw in the towel.

On 14 December 2019 Dan outpointed the previously unbeaten Lawrence Osueke over ten rounds at the Brentwood Centre to claim the vacant English title.

After successfully defending the English title twice, Azeez got another chance to step on to the big platform as his clash with Hosea Burton for the vacant British  title was to be shown live on Sky Sports.
On 20 November 2021 Azeez put on an impressive performance and blasted Burton to a halt in the seventh round to become the new British  champion at The SSE Arena, Wembley. Azeez dominated the fight with his unrelenting aggression from the first round. After a huge left hand, Azeez trapped Burton in the corner with a vicious barrage of punches to force the referee's intervention.

Professional boxing record

References

External links 

 

 

Light-heavyweight boxers
English male boxers
1989 births
Living people